Monojapyx is a genus of diplurans in the family Japygidae.

Species
 Monojapyx simplex (Verhoeff, 1923)

References

Diplura